Dzhalykovo is a rural locality (a selo) and the administrative center of Dhalykovskoye rural municipality, Lagansky District, Republic of Kalmykia, Russia. The population was 1,084 as of 2010. Kalmyks make up a majority of the population, with ethnic Russians being the most significant minority.

Sights 
Dzhalykovo is home to Galsang Xurl, the oldest Buddhist temple in Kalmykia.

References 

Rural localities in Lagansky District